Dairsie Old Church, formerly St Mary's Church, is the former parish church of Dairsie, in north-east Fife, Scotland. The present church was built in 1621, and is an unusual example of post-Reformation Gothic architecture in Scotland. It is no longer in use as a church, and is protected as a Category A listed building.

History
A church at Dairsie is recorded in 1183. In 1300 the church was granted to the Convent of St Andrews; it may have been rebuilt at this time.

In 1621, the present church was built by John Spottiswoode (1565–1639), Archbishop of St Andrews, who had recently bought the adjacent Dairsie Castle. The Spottiswoode family crest, with John Spottiswoode's initials, is carved over the west door.

In the late 18th century the original flat roof was replaced with the present piend (hipped) roof. A major refit was carried out in 1835–1837, including works to the interior, although most of this has since been removed.

Ecclesiastical use of the church ceased in 1966, the congregation now using the former Free Church in Dairsie village.

References

External links
Excerpts From The 1861 Parochial Directory Of Fife And Kinross: Parish Of Dairsie, Fife Family History Society

Churches in Fife
Category A listed buildings in Fife
Listed churches in Scotland
Religious buildings and structures completed in 1621
1621 establishments in Scotland